Donald L. Branson (June 2, 1920 – November 12, 1966) was an American racecar driver.

Career
Born in Rantoul, Illinois, Branson drove in the USAC Championship Car series and also in sprint cars, racing champ cars in the 1956–1966 seasons with 128 starts, including the 1959–1966 Indianapolis 500 races.  He finished in the top ten 85 times, with 7 victories.

Branson was also the 1959 and 1964 USAC Sprint Car Series Champion.

He was killed in 1966 in a crash at a sprint car race at Ascot Park in Gardena, California, which also claimed the life of fellow driver Dick Atkins. The fatal wreck occurred with only a few races left in the season for the USAC series.

Awards
He was inducted in the National Sprint Car Hall of Fame in 1994 and the National Midget Auto Racing Hall of Fame in 2012.

Complete USAC Championship Car results

Indianapolis 500 results

Complete Formula One World Championship results
(key)

References

1920 births
1966 deaths
Indianapolis 500 drivers
National Sprint Car Hall of Fame inductees
People from Rantoul, Illinois
Racing drivers from Illinois
Racing drivers who died while racing
Sports deaths in California